T. pulchra may refer to:

 Tibouchina pulchra, a synonym of Pleroma raddianum, a glory bush
 Tillandsia pulchra, a plant found in the Americas
 Timia pulchra, a picture-winged fly
 Titanio pulchra, a grass moth
 Tritonia pulchra, a sea slug